Nazzaro is a surname. Notable people with the name include:

 Felice Nazzaro (1881–1940), Italian racing driver
 Automobili Nazzaro, (1911-1924), Vehicle manufacturer founded in Turin by Felice Nazzaro
 Gianni Nazzaro (1948–2021), Italian singer and actor
 Giuseppe Nazzaro (1937–2015), Italian Roman Catholic bishop
 Joseph J. Nazzaro (1913–1990), United States Air Force general

See also
Nazarro
San Nazzaro (disambiguation)

Surnames of Italian origin